{{DISPLAYTITLE:Up0-interface}}
For digital transmission, the Up0-Interface is an integrated services digital network (ISDN) interface used in private networks. It is derived from the UK0-Interface used in public networks.

In public networks, the maximum cable length of an U bus is between 4 and 8 km, and the maximum length of an S0-bus is 900 meters for Point-to-Point configuration and about 150-300m for point-to-multipoint configurations. The Up0-bus has, depending on cable quality, a reach of between 2 and 4 km, far more than the S0-bus. This allows the use of ISDN telephone equipment in large private networks. Unlike the S0-bus, the Up0-bus runs at half duplex; that is, both sides alternate in sending and receiving.

While the S0-bus allows for several ISDN device connections (up to 8), the Up0-bus can connect only two devices, one at each end of the cable.

See also
 U interface

References
 Up0 Interface, Infineon PEB 2096 datasheet

Integrated Services Digital Network
ITU-T recommendations